Doodle Kids is an application for iPhone, iPad, and Android devices. It allows the user to draw shapes and colors on-screen.  The application was written by Lim Ding Wen when he was 9 years old. 

Doodle Kids was originally written for the Apple IIGS computer using Complete Pascal. It was designed by Ding Wen for his younger sisters to do random painting. Ding Wen later rewrote Doodle Kids for iPhone. As of the end of 2010, the application had more than 880,000 downloads for both iOS and Android platforms.
Doodle Kids is available for free download. Source code for the Apple IIGS version is available online.

References

IOS software
Android (operating system) software